The 2012–13 Hannover 96 season is the 117th season in the club's football history. In 2012–13 the club plays in the Fußball-Bundesliga, the top tier of German football. It is the clubs eleventh consecutive season in this league, having been promoted from the 2. Bundesliga in 2002.

The club also took part in the 2012–13 edition of the DFB-Pokal, the German Cup, where it reached the third round and faced the cup holders, Borussia Dortmund before being knocked out of the tournament on a 5–1 loss.

In Europe, the club qualified for the 2012–13 edition of the Europa League, where it played Anzhi Makhachkala in the Europa League Round of 32.

Review and events

Matches

Legend

Friendly matches

Bundesliga

DFB-Pokal

UEFA Europa League

Third qualifying round

Playoff round

Group stage

Round of 32

Squad

Coaching staff

Statistics

Goalscorers

Last updated: 18 May 2013

Clean sheets

Last updated: 18 May 2013

Sources

External links
 
 2012–13 Hannover 96 season at kicker.de 
 2012–13 Hannover 96 season at Fussballdaten.de 

Hannover
Hannover 96 seasons
Hannover 96